Olivia may refer to:

People
 Olivia (name), including a list of people and fictional characters with the name
 Olivia (singer) (Olivia Longott, born 1981), American singer
 Olívia (basketball) (Carlos Henrique Rodrigues do Nascimento, born 1974), Brazilian basketball player
 Olivia Lufkin (born 1979), also known mononymously as Olivia, Japanese-American singer
 Olivia Trappeniers (born 1997), also known mononymously as Olivia, Belgian Flemish singer 
 Oliva of Brescia (died 138), Christian martyr
 Olivia of Palermo (448–463), Christian martyr
 Oliva (singer) (Alejandra Lozano Castellote, born March 20, 1989), Colombian singer, songwriter, and businesswoman

Places
 Olivia, Mauritius, a place in Mauritius
 Olivia, Minnesota, United States
 Olivia, North Carolina, United States
 Olivia, Pennsylvania, United States
 Lake Olivia, in Highlands County, Florida

Arts and entertainment

Fictional characters

Olivia (fictional pig), in children's books by Ian Falconer
Olivia (Twelfth Night), in Shakespeare's play 
Olivia (The Walking Dead), in the comic book and TV franchise

Film and television
 Olivia (1951 film), a French film based on the Bussy novel
 Olivia (1983 film), an American psychological thriller film 
 Olivia (TV series), a children's animated TV series, 2009
 "Olivia" (Fringe episode), 2010

Literature
Olivia (Bussy novel), by Dorothy Bussy under the pen name "Olivia", 1949 
Olivia (Rossner novel), by Judith Rossner, 1994
Olivia (Rushton novel), by Rosie Rushton, 1997
Olivia (magazine), a Finnish women's magazine
Olivia (play), by W. G. Wills in the 1870s

Music
 Olivia (Olivia Newton-John album), 1972
 Olivia (Olivia album), 2001
 Olivia (EP), by Olivia Holt, 2016
 Olivia Records, record label
 "Olivia", a 2013 song by Rasmus Seebach
 "(Olivia) Lost and Turned Out", a 1978 song by The Whispers from the album Headlights
 "Olivia", a song by One Direction on their 2015 album Made in the A.M.

Other uses
 Olivia (dog) (born 2015), a dog actress
 Olivia Travel, a lesbian-oriented travel company
 Olivia MFSK, an amateur radio digital transmission protocol
 835 Olivia, an asteroid
 Olivia Business Centre, in Gdansk, Poland
 Hala Olivia, an arena in Gdańsk, Poland
 Tropical Storm Olivia, a list of tropical storms named Olivia

See also

Oliva (disambiguation)